USAC may refer to:
 Unified Speech and Audio Coding, an audio compression scheme
 United States Army Cadet Corps, a non-profit youth education organization
 United States Auto Club, a sanctioning body for auto racing in the United States
 Universal Service Administrative Company, a not-for-profit corporation located in Washington, DC
 Universidad de San Carlos de Guatemala, a University in Guatemala City, Guatemala
 USA Cycling, or USAC, a governing body for bicycle racing in the United States
 USA Cricket, a governing body for the sport of cricket in the United States
 USA Climbing, a governing body for the sport of competition climbing in the United States
 Utah State Agricultural College, now known as Utah State University, a school in Logan, Utah, USA